In Boolean logic, a Reed–Muller expansion (or Davio expansion) is a decomposition of a Boolean function.

For a Boolean function  we call

Then we have for the Reed–Muller or positive Davio expansion:

Description

Repeated application of the Reed–Muller expansion results in an XOR polynomial in :

This representation is unique and sometimes also called Reed–Muller expansion.

E.g. for  the result would be

where 

.

For  the result would be

where

.

Geometric interpretation

(The other, unmentioned coefficients can be obtained by symmetry.)

Paths
The shortest paths all involve monotonic changes to the values of the variables, whereas non-shortest paths all involve non-monotonic changes of such variables; or, to put it another way, the shortest paths all have lengths equal to the Hamming distance between the starting and destination vertices. This means that it should be easy to generalize an algorithm for obtaining coefficients from a truth table by XORing up values of the function from appropriate rows of a truth table, even for hyperdimensional cases ( and above). Between the starting and destination rows of a truth table, some variables have their values remaining fixed: find all the rows of the truth table such that those variables likewise remain fixed at those given values, then XOR up their functions and the result should be the coefficient for the monomial corresponding to the destination row. (In such monomial, include any variable whose value is 1 (at that row) and exclude any variable whose value is 0 (at that row), instead of including the negation of the variable whose value is 0, as in the minterm style.)

Similar to binary decision diagrams (BDDs), where nodes represent Shannon expansion with respect to the according variable, we can define a 
decision diagram based on the Reed–Muller expansion. These decision diagrams are called functional BDDs (FBDDs).

Derivations 
The Reed–Muller expansion can be derived from the XOR-form of the Shannon decomposition, using the identity :

Derivation of the expansion for :

Derivation of the second-order boolean derivative:

See also
 Algebraic normal form (ANF)
 Ring sum normal form (RSNF)
 Zhegalkin polynomial
 Karnaugh map
 Irving Stoy Reed
 David Eugene Muller
 Reed–Muller code

References

Further reading
 
 
 
 
 
 
  (188 pages)

Boolean algebra